"My Own Summer (Shove It)" is a song by American alternative metal band Deftones, released in 1997 by Maverick Records as the first single from their second album Around the Fur. It was Deftones' first charting single, reaching number 29 in the UK Singles Chart. The song also features backing vocals from bassist Chi Cheng, in the chorus. The song has been described as a defining track of the alternative metal and nu metal genres.

Music video
The video for "My Own Summer (Shove It)", directed by Dean Karr, begins with a clip of a cage falling into the sea, and blood seeping out of it into the surrounding waters. It then moves to footage of the band playing on a set of floating anti-shark cages. Eventually, a shark appears and is seen to be eating a piece of meat, presumably the contents of the cage. At the end of the video, frontman Chino Moreno falls into the water and the video fades out.

The video was shot at Pyramid Lake, California, with additional footage of the sharks coming from the Great Barrier Reef in Australia.

An interview with Moreno that takes place during the filming of the video was included on the DVD release of B-Sides & Rarities.

Legacy
In 2012, Loudwire ranked the song number seven on their list of the 10 greatest Deftones songs, and in 2020, Kerrang ranked the song number one on their list of the 20 greatest Deftones songs.

Appearances in other media
A version of the song was featured on the soundtrack of The Matrix.

Track listing

The live tracks on both CDs were recorded at the Melkweg in Amsterdam on October 13, 1997.

The song was made available to download on October 26, 2010 for use in the Rock Band 3 music gaming platform in both Basic rhythm, and notably PRO mode which allows use of a real guitar or bass guitar, and MIDI-compatible electronic drum kits or keyboards in addition to three-part harmony or backup vocals.

Charts

References

1997 songs
1997 singles
Deftones songs
Maverick Records singles
Songs written by Abe Cunningham
Songs written by Chi Cheng (musician)
Songs written by Chino Moreno
Songs written by Stephen Carpenter